The following is a list of notable events and releases of the year 1980 in Norwegian music.

Events

March
 28 – The 7th Vossajazz started in Voss, Norway (March 28 – 30).

April
 19 – Norway was represented by Sverre Kjelsberg and Mattis Hætta, with the song '"Sámiid Ædnan", at the 1980 Eurovision Song Contest.

May
 21
 The 28th Bergen International Festival started in Bergen, Norway (May 21 – June 4).
 The 8th Nattjazz started in Bergen, Norway (May 21 – June 4).

June
 29 – The 12th Kalvøyafestivalen started at Kalvøya near by Oslo.

Unknown date
The pop duo Dollie de Luxe established, consisting of Benedicte Adrian and Ingrid Bjørnov.
The band Vazelina Bilopphøggers was established in Gjøvik.

Albums released

Unknown date

A
 The Aller Værste!
 Materialtretthet (Den Gode Hensikt)

E
 Jan Eggum
 Alarmen Går (Philips Records)

G
 Jan Garbarek
 Magico (ECM Records), with Charlie Haden and Egberto Gismonti
 Aftenland (ECM Records), with Kjell Johnsen

R
 Inger Lise Rypdal
 Sign Language (RCA Victor)
 Terje Rypdal
 Descendre (ECM Records)

Deaths

 October
 26 – Bjørn Fongaard, composer, guitarist, and teacher (born 1919).

 December
 8 – Sverre Bergh, composer and pianist (born 1915).

Births

 January
 3 – David Arthur Skinner, British jazz pianist and composer, living in Norway.
 15 – Christoffer Andersen, blues guitarist.

 March
 2 – Ingrid Bolsø Berdal, singer and  actress.
 10 – Lars Horntveth, multi-instrumentalist, composer, and band leader, Jaga Jazzist.

 May
 5 – Stian Omenås, jazz trumpeter, music conductor, and composer

 July
 4 – Thomas J. Bergersen, composer and multi-instrumentalist.
 11 – Jenny Hval, musician, singer, songwriter, lyricist and writer.

 August
 16 – Øystein Moen, jazz pianist and keyboarder, Puma and Jaga Jazzist.
 25 – Pål Hausken, jazz drummer, In the Country.

 September
 3 – Jørgen Munkeby, jazz and heavy metal singer, multi-instrumentalist, and songwriter, Shining.
 25 – Christina Bjordal, jazz singer.

 October
 3 – Kjetil Mørland, singer and songwriter.
 17 – Siri Wålberg, musical artist performing as Sissy Wish.

 November
 6 – Lena Nymark, jazz singer and music teacher.
 25 – Silje Nes, multi-instrumentalist, singer, and songwriter.
 28 – Kim André Arnesen, composer.

 December
 28 – Andreas Amundsen, jazz bassist.

 Unknown date
 Anton Eger, jazz drummer.

See also
 1980 in Norway
 Music of Norway
 Norway in the Eurovision Song Contest 1980

References

 
Norwegian music
Norwegian
Music
1980s in Norwegian music